The 2008 United States Senate election in Virginia was held on November 4, 2008. Incumbent Republican U.S. Senator John Warner decided to retire instead of seeking a sixth term. Democratic former Governor Mark Warner (no relation) won the open seat by more than 31 percentage points. Warner became the first Democrat to win this seat since 1966. This was also the first time since 1964 that the state voted simultaneously for a Democratic presidential candidate and a Democratic Senate candidate, having voted for Barack Obama in the presidential election, albeit by a far lesser margin. This was Virginia's first open-seat election since 1988.

Warner's large margin of victory was reflected throughout the state — Gilmore won only six counties and independent cities (Augusta, Colonial Heights, Hanover, Poquoson, Powhatan and Rockingham) and his margin didn't exceed more than 2,000 votes in any of them. As of 2022, this is the last time Amelia County and Bland County voted Democratic.

Background 
John Warner, a former United States Under Secretary of the Navy, had served Virginia in the Senate since 1979, and had been cagey about whether he would be running for re-election. He would have been favored for a sixth term had he decided to run again, even with recent Democratic gains in the state. In early 2007, it was speculated that Warner, who turned 80 in February of that year, would retire. When Warner reported on April 12, 2007 that he had raised only $500 in campaign contributions during the first quarter, speculation increased that he may not seek a sixth term.

On August 31, 2007, Warner formally announced that he would not be seeking re-election. The race was expected to be competitive, given the Democrats' two successive gubernatorial victories (2001, 2005) and the unseating of Republican senator George Allen by Jim Webb in 2006.

The Wall Street Journal reported a story of National Republican Senatorial Committee chairman Senator John Ensign outlining the 10 most competitive seats of the 2008 Senate Election. When asked about the two GOP seats likely to switch parties, Virginia and New Mexico, on whether the NRSC is mulling walking away to work on other seats that can be won, Ensign said, "You don't waste money on races that don't need it or you can't win." This suggested that the NRSC may have started cutting money off.

State conventions

Democratic Party 
On September 12, 2007, former Governor Mark Warner (no relation to John Warner) announced his candidacy.  Mark Warner had challenged John Warner for his Senate seat in 1996, but was narrowly defeated.  Mark Warner later won election in 2001 as Governor of Virginia, and left office with a high level of popularity in 2006. He was confirmed as the party nominee at the state convention on June 10, 2008, as he went unopposed.

Republican Party 
On September 16, 2007, Republican Rep. Tom Davis of the 11th District unofficially announced that he would seek election to the seat. The Washington Times reported that John Warner delayed his retirement announcement specifically to help Davis.

On October 1, 2007, the editors of the National Review encouraged Virginia voters to draft General Peter Pace, the retiring Chairman of the Joint Chiefs of Staff, to run in 2008 for the Senate seat to be vacated by retiring Senator John Warner.  The magazine cited Pace's conservative Catholic beliefs in making its suggestion.

On October 13, the Republican Party of Virginia's State Central Committee voted 47-37 to hold a statewide convention rather than a primary. Former Virginia governor Jim Gilmore argued strongly for a convention, claiming it would save the candidates money.  It reportedly costs $4 million to compete in a primary, while it costs only $1 million for a convention. Davis argued that a primary would expose the candidates to the kind of environment they would face in November. A primary was thought to favor Davis due to his popularity in voter-rich Northern Virginia. In contrast, a convention was thought to favor Gilmore because most of the delegates would come from the party's activist base, which is tilted heavily to the right.  With the decision, Gilmore said he was seriously considering entering the race.

Davis dropped out of the race on October 25, 2007, citing the potential difficulties of defeating Gilmore in the conservative-dominated GOP convention and in taking on Warner, who is very popular in Davis' own Northern Virginia base. Gilmore confirmed his candidacy on November 19, 2007.

On January 7, 2008, Delegate Bob Marshall (R-Prince William County), a sixteen-year state legislator from Northern Virginia known for his social conservative values, announced he would challenge Gilmore for the Republican nomination May 31, 2008. The convention was held on May 31, 2008, where Gilmore won the nomination with 50.3% of the vote, just 66 votes more than Marshall.

Republican Convention Vote

Third parties 
On March 29, 2008, the Libertarian Party of Virginia state convention nominated Bill Redpath as its Senate candidate. Redpath, who was serving as national party chair at the time, cited the importance of running a Libertarian candidate for federal office this election year, considering the fact that the Independent Greens have been fielding candidates so actively in recent years. Glenda Gail Parker from Alexandria, a retired U.S. Air Force officer, ran again for the Independent Greens as she did in the 2006 Senate election.

Nominated candidates 
After the Democratic, Republican, and Libertarian State Conventions, the final nominated candidates for the 2008 Virginia Senate Election were:

 Jim Gilmore - Republican Nominee - From Henrico County, Virginia
 Mark Warner - Democratic Nominee - From Alexandria, Virginia
 Bill Redpath - Libertarian Nominee - From Leesburg, Virginia
 Glenda Gail Parker - Green Nominee - From Alexandria, Virginia

General election

Candidates 
 Jim Gilmore (R), former governor
 Glenda Parker (G)
 Bill Redpath (L)
 Mark Warner (D), former governor

Campaign 

After the conclusions of the state conventions, Democrat Mark Warner had emerged as the front-runner for the Class 2 Senate seat from Virginia.  Some early polling showed Mark Warner leading Jim Gilmore by as much as 2-1.

Pundits and analysists believed Virginia to be the single strongest pickup opportunity for the Democrats due to Warner's consistent lead in the polls.

Jim Gilmore responded aggressively, mostly with ads on the Internet; his campaign had very little money.  Gilmore attacked Warner for raising taxes during his term as governor, when he had pledged not to do so, flip-flopping among many other topics.

On October 6, 2008, Mark Warner and Jim Gilmore debated various issues, including the Emergency Economic Stabilization Act of 2008, the Iraq War and Judicial nominees. The Richmond Times Dispatch sponsored the debate held at the Taubman Museum of Art, Roanoke, Virginia.

Mark Warner argued he'd be part of a radical centrist coalition, no matter who won the Presidency. He claimed the coalition would improve cooperation in the Congress and its subsequent public perception. Warner spoke of alternative energy, and Gilmore argued for offshore drilling. The issue of the 2004 tax increase under then-Governor Mark Warner was raised at the first debate of the campaign between Gilmore and Warner.

The Washington Post reported on July 24, 2008, that Jim Gilmore "submitted false information on two financial disclosure forms that hid his ties to a government contractor embroiled in a legal dispute over allegations that two of its executives had conspired to defraud the federal government." The Gilmore campaign responded by saying, the controversy was due to a "clerical error."

On election night, Warner was declared the winner based on exit polls alone, before the votes were counted.

Fundraising 
Money played a large role in the campaign. By July, Mark Warner had raised $9 million, while Jim Gilmore had raised $1.2 million. This does not include money from the DSCC or NRSC.

Endorsements 
Mark Warner
 Bristol Herald-Courier
 Daily Press (Newport News)
 Danville Register & Bee
 Fredericksburg Free Lance-Star
 Loudoun Times-Mirror
 Martinsville Bulletin
 News and Advance (Lynchburg)
 The Roanoke Times
 The Virginian-Pilot (Norfolk)
 The Washington Post

Jim Gilmore
 Richmond Times-Dispatch

Predictions

Polling

Results

See also 
 2008 United States Senate elections

References

External links 
General
 Virginia State Board of Elections
 U.S. Congress candidates for Virginia at Project Vote Smart
 Virginia, U.S.  Senate from CQ Politics
 Virginia U.S. Senate from OurCampaigns.com
 Virginia Senate race from 2008 Race Tracker
 Campaign contributions from OpenSecrets
 Gilmore (R) vs M. Warner (D) graph of multiple polls from Pollster.com
Official campaign websites (Archived)
 Jim Gilmore for Senate, Republican nominee
 Mark Warner for Senate, Democratic nominee
 Bill Redpath for Senate, Libertarian nominee

2008
Virginia
United States Senate
Jim Gilmore
Mark Warner